Villars may refer to:

Places

France
Villars, Dordogne
Villars, Eure-et-Loir
Villars, Loire
Villars, Vaucluse
Villars-les-Dombes, Ain
Villars-le-Sec, Territoire de Belfort

Switzerland

Canton of Jura
 Villars-sur-Fontenais, Fontenais

Canton of Fribourg
Villars-d'Avry in Pont-en-Ogoz
Villars-sous-Mont in Bas-Intyamon
Villars-sur-Glâne
Villars-sur-Marly, Pierrafortscha

Canton of Vaud
Villars-sur-Ollon
Villars Bozon, L'Isle
Bougy-Villars
Lussery-Villars
Villars-Bramard 
Villars-Burquin
Villars-Epeney 
Villars-le-Comte 
Villars-le-Grand
Villars-le-Terroir
Villars-Mendraz
Villars-Sainte-Croix
Villars-sous-Champvent
Villars-sous-Yens
Villars-Tiercelin

People
Claude Louis Hector de Villars (1653–1734), Marshal of France
Dominique Villars (1745–1814), French botanist
Felix Villars (1921–2002), biophysicist

Other uses
Villars Maître Chocolatier, a Swiss chocolate company

See also